Constrictor may refer to:

Biology 
 Any snake that kills its prey by constriction
 A taxonomic synonym for Boa, also known as "boas", a genus of non-venomous boas found in Central and South America, Mexico and Madagascar
 A taxonomic synonym for Python, also known as "pythons", a genus of non-venomous pythons found in Africa and Asia

Other uses 
 Constrictor (album), a 1986 album by Alice Cooper
 Constrictor (comics), a supervillain/hero in the Marvel Comics universe
 Constrictor knot, a binding knot
 Pharyngeal constrictor, one of the muscles that serves to constrict the pharynx